The first stamps issued by Guernsey were forced upon the island by the shortage of British stamps in 1941 during the German occupation of the Channel Islands

Guernsey Post has issued postage stamps in the Bailiwick of Guernsey since its creation in 1969 when the postal service was separated from the Royal Mail. From 1983 Guernsey has issued stamps designated Alderney.

Early issues

In 1940 Guernsey was occupied by Wehrmacht forces and the supply of postage stamps from the United Kingdom ceased. Not wishing to use Feldpost stamps and with the local stocks running out, the first solution in December 1940 was to cut, diagonally stamps so turning a 2d stamp into two 1d stamps.

Then in 1941 a simple stamp design was created by E.W. Vaudin with the main design adopted by both Jersey and Guernsey and feature three heraldic lions, a form of resistance against the occupation as the shield is that of both Guernsey and of the Duke of Normandy, the stamps also include four small V's for victory.

In 1947, for the 3rd anniversary of liberation, the Royal Mail issued two stamps, designed primarily for use in the Channel Islands depicting the gathering of Vraic (seaweed).

In 1958 the idea of Country definitives resulted in regional postage stamps being printed in Britain. Eric Piprell designed the Guernsey stamps. These show the Crown of William the Conqueror and the Guernsey lily.

Guernsey Post

1969-1989

Pre decimal

Decimal

1990-2009

1 Local - postage within the Bailiwick of Guernsey
2 UK - postage to the United Kingdom 
3 EUR - postage to Europe 
4 ROW - postage to the Rest of the World 
5 INT - International postage

2010-

See also

 Postage stamps and postal history of Guernsey
 List of postage stamps of Alderney
 Postage stamps and postal history of Jersey

References

External links
Guernsey Stamps

G